Vintana sertichi is an early groundhog-like mammal dating from the Late Cretaceous, approximately 66 million years ago. Scientists found the lone fossil, a skull, on Madagascar's west coast in the Maastrichtian Maevarano Formation.

Vintana is extremely relevant to the understanding of gondwanatheres because it is the first well-preserved skull, as opposed to previous fragments and teeth. Establishing a connection with multituberculates and haramiyidans in the theriiform clade Allotheria, it is a rather unusual animal, possessing massive lateral flanges in its skull whose exact purpose is poorly understood, as well as massive olfactory bulbs.

See also 
 2014 in mammal paleontology

References

External links

Cretaceous Madagascar
Cretaceous mammals of Africa
Fossils of Madagascar
Fossil taxa described in 2014
Maevarano fauna
Maastrichtian life
Taxa named by David W. Krause
Taxa named by Simone Hoffmann
Taxa named by John R. Wible
Taxa named by E. Christopher Kirk
Taxa named by Julia A. Schultz
Taxa named by Wighart von Koenigswald
Taxa named by Joseph R. Groenke
Taxa named by James B. Rossie
Taxa named by Patrick M. O'Connor (herpetologist)
Taxa named by Erik R. Seiffert
Taxa named by Elizabeth R. Dumont
Taxa named by Waymon L. Holloway
Taxa named by Raymond R. Rogers
Taxa named by Lydia J. Rahantarisoa
Taxa named by Addison D. Kemp
Taxa named by Haingoson Andriamialison